The Park Ridge Public Library serves residents and businesses of the city of Park Ridge, Illinois.   Park Ridge is a northwest suburb of Chicago. The library serves a population of 37,775 residents and is located at 20 S. Prospect Avenue, Park Ridge, IL 60068 in the Uptown neighborhood. The purpose of the Park Ridge Public Library is to advance human knowledge and understanding by providing access to information, literature, technology, and the arts relevant to the community it serves.

History
The library, which was established with a $7,500 grant from the Carnegie Foundation, opened to the public on December 6, 1913.  Originally the library was open 10 hours a week which was increased to 15 hours in 1923 and 61 hours in 1932. A thousand books were donated to the new library by the George Carpenter Estate.  The total book collection consisted of 2,072 volumes.  Upon opening, the library had only two paid staff members.
The library was originally located at 1 N. Northwest Highway. That building served as the City's library for 44 years until a new one was built across the street. The current library was built in 1958. An addition was added in 1977 that doubled the size of the building.

Resources
The Park Ridge Public Library has a collection of over 200,000 items with an annual circulation of over 700,00 items.   They offer a variety of resources including:   

Books
Movies
CDs
Books on CD
Graphic Novels
Magazines
Newspapers
Video Games
Computer Games
Puzzles
Music Literacy Kits
Sparki Robot 
Ozobot
Dash 
GoPro Hero 5 or Hero+
Green Screen Lighting Kit
Merge Virtual Reality Glasses
Orion Starblast Telescope
Projector 
Tripod
Playstation VR 
Umbrellas 
Bike Locks

Services
The library is not only rich in resources, but also in the services offered to its residents.  Each department offers a variety of service to the residents of Park Ridge.
Reference Department
Readers Services Department
Young Adult Department
Children's Department

The library is also an excellent source for free programs for adults such as:

 Art lectures
 Music performances
 Cooking demonstrations
 Theatrical presentations
 Health programs
 Feature films
 Foreign films
 Travel films

References

External links 
  Park Ridge Public Library Web site
  Park Ridge Public Library catalog
  History of the Park Ridge Public Library
 Park Ridge Community Network
 City of Park Ridge

Public libraries in Illinois
Park Ridge, Illinois
Libraries in Cook County, Illinois
Library buildings completed in 1913
1913 establishments in Illinois